Warrington's Own Buses, formerly Warrington Borough Transport, is a municipal bus company operating in the borough of Warrington, England.

There are several examples of former vehicles that used to operate for the company that are now preserved or undergoing restoration. Some of these are located at transport museums, whilst others can be seen at rallies and historic running days around the country. Many of the earlier examples feature the traditional Warrington licence plate area letter code "ED".

See also
 North West Museum of Road Transport

References

External links
Warrington's Own Buses official website

Transport in Warrington